North American moths represent about 12,000 types of moths. In comparison, there are about 825 species of North American butterflies. The moths (mostly nocturnal) and butterflies (mostly diurnal) together make up the taxonomic order Lepidoptera.

This list is sorted by MONA number (MONA is short for Moths of America North of Mexico). A numbering system for North American moths introduced by Ronald W. Hodges, et al. in 1983 in the publication Check List of the Lepidoptera of America North of Mexico. The list has since been updated, but the placement in families is outdated for some species.

This list covers America north of Mexico (effectively the continental United States and Canada). For a list of moths and butterflies recorded from the state of Hawaii, see List of Lepidoptera of Hawaii.

This is a partial list, covering moths with MONA numbers ranging from 0001 to 854.1. For the rest of the list, see List of moths of North America.

Micropterigidae
0001 – Epimartyria auricrinella, goldcap moss-eater moth
0002 – Epimartyria pardella
no number yet – Epimartyria bimaculella

Eriocraniidae
0003 – Dyseriocrania griseocapitella, chinquapin leaf-miner moth
0004 – Dyseriocrania auricyanea
0005 – Eriocrania semipurpurella, purplish birch-miner moth
0006 – Eriocrania breviapex
0007 – Eriocraniella aurosparsella
0008 – Eriocraniella xanthocara
0009 – Eriocraniella longifurcula
0010 – Eriocraniella platyptera
0011 – Eriocraniella variegata
0012 – Eriocraniella trigona
0013 – Eriocraniella falcata
0013.1 – Eriocraniella mediabulla
0014 – Neocrania bifasciata

Acanthopteroctetidae
0015 – Acanthopteroctetes tripunctata
0016 – Acanthopteroctetes bimaculata
0017 – Acanthopteroctetes unifascia
0017.1 – Acanthopteroctetes aurulenta

Hepialidae
0018 – Sthenopis argenteomaculatus, silver-spotted ghost moth
0019 – Sthenopis purpurascens, four-spotted ghost moth
0021 – Sthenopis thule, willow ghost moth
0022 – Sthenopis auratus, gold-spotted ghost moth
0023 – Gazoryctra hyperboreus
0023.1 – Gazoryctra sciophanes
0024 – Gazoryctra confusus
0025 – Gazoryctra roseicaput
0026 – Gazoryctra pulcher
0027 – Gazoryctra mcglashani
0028 – Gazoryctra mathewi, Matthew's ghost moth
0029 – Gazoryctra novigannus
0029.1 – Gazoryctra wielgusi
0031 – Korscheltellus gracilis, conifer swift moth
0031.1 – Korscheltellus lupulina, common swift moth
0032 – Gazoryctra lembertii
0033 – Phymatopus behrensi
0035 – Phymatopus californicus, lupine ghost moths
0036 – Phymatopus hectoides

Nepticulidae
0037 – Ectoedemia ochrefasciella, hard maple budminer moth
0038 – Ectoedemia sericopeza, Norway maple seedminer
0039 – Ectoedemia argyropeza
0040 – Ectoedemia canutus, balsam poplar petiole miner
0041 – Ectoedemia trinotata
0042 – Ectoedemia marmaropa
0043 – Ectoedemia platanella, sycamore leaf blotch miner
0044 – Ectoedemia clemensella
0045 – Ectoedemia similella
0046 – Ectoedemia virgulae
0047 – Ectoedemia lindquisti, small birch leafminer moth
0048 – Ectoedemia rubifoliella
0049 – Ectoedemia ulmella
0049.1 – Ectoedemia andrella
0050 – Ectoedemia nyssaefoliella
0051 – Ectoedemia quadrinotata
0052 – Ectoedemia populella, aspen petiole gall moth
0053 – Ectoedemia obrutella
0053.1 – Ectoedemia acanthella
0053.2 – Ectoedemia piperella
0054 – Ectoedemia chlorantis
0055 – Ectoedemia heinrichi
0056 – Ectoedemia castaneae
0057 – Ectoedemia phleophaga
0058 – Ectoedemia mesoloba
0058.1 – Ectoedemia reneella
0058.2 – Ectoedemia helenella
0059 – Trifurcula saccharella
0060 – Ectoedemia pteliaeella
0061 – Ectoedemia hypericella
0062 – Stigmella crataegifoliella
0063 – Stigmella scintillans
0064 – Stigmella pomivorella
0065 – Stigmella chalybeia
0066 – Stigmella scinanella
0067 – Stigmella purpuratella
0068 – Stigmella stigmaciella
0069 – Stigmella taeniola
0070 – Stigmella prunifoliella
0071 – Stigmella ceanothi
0072 – Stigmella intermedia
0073 – Stigmella rhoifoliella
0074 – Stigmella rhamnicola
0075 – Stigmella diffasciae
0076 – Stigmella gossypii, cotton leafminer moth
0076.1 – Stigmella inconspicuella
0076.2 – Stigmella heteromelis
0077 – Stigmella cerea
0078 – Stigmella rosaefoliella
0079 – Stigmella slingerlandella
0080 – Stigmella villosella
0081 – Stigmella apicialbella
0082 – Stigmella fuscotibiella
0083 – Ectoedemia canadensis
0084 – Stigmella populetorum
0085 – Stigmella aromella
0086 – Stigmella pallida
0087 – Stigmella saginella
0088 – Stigmella macrocarpae
0089 – Stigmella nigriverticella
0090 – Stigmella castaneaefoliella
0091 – Stigmella flavipedella
0091.1 – Stigmella sclerostyla
0092 – Stigmella corylifoliella
0093 – Stigmella ostryaefoliella
0094 – Stigmella myricafoliella
0095 – Stigmella juglandifoliella, pecan serpentine leafminer moth
0095.1 – Stigmella longisacca
0096 – Stigmella unifasciella
0097 – Stigmella condaliafoliella
0098 – Stigmella tiliella
0099 – Stigmella quercipulchella
0100 – Stigmella variella
0101 – Stigmella altella
0102 – Stigmella procrastinella
0103 – Stigmella alba
0104 – Stigmella braunella
0105 – Stigmella argentifasciella
0105.1 – Stigmella plumosetaeella
0106 – Stigmella amelanchierella
0107 – Ectoedemia anguinella
0108 – Stigmella belfrageella
0109 – Ectoedemia grandisella
0109.1 – Ectoedemia coruscella
0109.2 – Ectoedemia reneella
0109.3 – Ectoedemia weaveri
0110 – Ectoedemia platea
0111 – Stigmella resplendensella
0112 – Acalyptris thoracealbella
0112.1 – Acalyptris bipinnatellus
0113 – Acalyptris bicornutus
0114 – Acalyptris punctulata
0114.1 – Acalyptris lotella
0114.2 – Acalyptris postalatratus
0114.3 – Acalyptris distaleus
0115 – Acalyptris tenuijuxtus
0116 – Acalyptris scirpi
0117 – Enteucha basidactyla
0118 – Enteucha gilvafascia

Opostegidae
0119 – Pseudopostega cretea
0119.1 – Pseudopostega floridensis
0119.2 – Pseudopostega parakempella
0119.3 – Pseudopostega acidata
0119.4 – Pseudopostega texana
0119.5 – Pseudopostega venticola
0121 – Pseudopostega albogaleriella
0122 – Pseudopostega quadristrigella, gooseberry barkminer moth
0124 – Pseudopostega kempella
0125 – Opostegoides scioterma

Tischeriidae
0126 – Coptotriche citrinipennella
0127 – Coptotriche mediostriata
0128 – Coptotriche consanguinea
0129 – Coptotriche badiiella
0130 – Coptotriche lucida
0131 – Coptotriche distincta
0132 – Coptotriche subnubila
0133 – Coptotriche concolor
0134 – Coptotriche simulata
0135 – Coptotriche purinosella
0136 – Coptotriche discreta
0137 – Coptotriche arizonica
0138 – Coptotriche clemensella
0139 – Coptotriche fuscomarginella
0140 – Coptotriche castaneaeella
0141 – Coptotriche perplexa
0143 – Coptotriche zelleriella
0144 – Tischeria quercitella, oak blotch miner moth
0145 – Coptotriche malifoliella, apple leaf trumpet miner moth
0146 – Coptotriche crataegifoliae
0147 – Coptotriche roseticola
0148 – Coptotriche agrimoniella
0149 – Coptotriche aenea, blackberry leafminer moth
0150 – Coptotriche splendida
0151 – Coptotriche insolita
0152 – Coptotriche confusa
0153 – Coptotriche inexpectata
0154 – Coptotriche amelanchieris
0155 – Coptotriche admirabilis
0156 – Astrotischeria solidagonifoliella
0157 – Astrotischeria astericola
0158 – Astrotischeria occidentalis
0159 – Astrotischeria heliopsisella
0160 – Astrotischeria ambrosiaeella
0161 – Astrotischeria helianthi
0162 – Astrotischeria gregaria
0163 – Astrotischeria marginata
0164 – Astrotischeria heteroterae
0165 – Astrotischeria longeciliata
0166 – Astrotischeria pallidipennella
0167 – Tischeria ceanothi
0169 – Tischeria ambigua
0170 – Tischeria bifurcata
0171 – Astrotischeria omissa
0172 – Astrotischeria explosa
0173 – Tischeria pulvella

Incurvariidae and Prodoxidae
0174 – Incurvaria vetulella
0174.1 – Alloclemensia americana
0175 – Lampronia russatella
0176 – Lampronia oregonella
0177 – Lampronia capitella, currant shoot borer moth
0178 – Lampronia taylorella
0179 – Lampronia trimaculella
0180 – Lampronia rubiella, raspberry bud moth
0180.1 – Lampronia corticella, raspberry bud moth
0181 – Paraclemensia acerifoliella, maple leafcutter moth
0182 – Vespina quercivora
0183 – Phylloporia bistrigella
0184 – Lampronia aenescens
0185 – Lampronia sublustris
0186 – Lampronia humilis
0186.1 – Tetragma gei
0187 – Greya obscuromaculata
0188 – Greya sparsipunctella
0189 – Greya punctiferella
0189.1 – Greya piperella
0189.2 – Greya mitellae
0189.3 – Greya obscura
0190 – Greya variata
0191 – Greya subalba
0192 – Greya solenobiella
0192.1 – Greya suffusca
0193 – Greya reticulata
0193.1 – Greya powelli
0194 – Greya politella
0194.1 – Greya enchrysa
0194.2 – Greya variabilis
0194.3 – Greya pectinifera
0195 – Tridentaforma fuscoleuca
0196 – Tegeticula synthetica
0197 – Tegeticula maculata
0197.1 – Tegeticula altiplanella
0197.2 – Tegeticula cassandra
0197.3 – Tegeticula baccatella
0197.4 – Tegeticula intermedius
0197.5 – Tegeticula carnerosanella
0198 – Tegeticula yuccasella, yucca moth
0198.1 – Tegeticula corruptrix
0198.2 – Tegeticula elatella
0198.3 – Tegeticula maderae
0198.4 – Tegeticula mojavella
0198.5 – Tegeticula rostratella
0198.6 – Tegeticula superficiella
0198.7 – Tegeticula treculeanella
0199 – Parategeticula pollenifera
0200 – Prodoxus quinquepunctella
0200.1 – Prodoxus decipiens, bogus yucca moth
0201 – Prodoxus y-inversum
0201.1 – Prodoxus praedictus
0202 – Prodoxus coloradensis
0202.2 – Prodoxus phylloryctus
0203 – Prodoxus ochrocarus
0204 – Prodoxus sordidus
0205 – Prodoxus marginatus
0206 – Prodoxus pulverulentus
0207 – Prodoxus cinereus
0208 – Prodoxus aenescens
0209 – Mesepiola specca
0210 – Agavenema barberella
0211 – Agavenema pallida

Adelidae
0212 – Cauchas dietziella
0213 – Cauchas cyanella
0214 – Cauchas sedella
0215 – Cauchas cockerelli
0216 – Cauchas simpliciella
0217 – Cauchas discalis
0218 – Nemophora bellela
0219 – Adela punctiferella
0220 – Adela singulella
0221 – Adela septentrionella
0222 – Adela oplerella
0223 – Adela thorpella
0224 – Adela flammeusella
0225 – Adela trigrapha
0226 – Adela eldorada
0227 – Adela caeruleella, southern longhorn moth
0228 – Adela ridingsella, Ridings' fairy moth
0229 – Adela purpurea

Heliozelidae and Elachistidae
0230 – Heliozela aesella
0231 – Heliozela gracilis
0232 – Antispila cornifoliella
0233 – Antispila freemani
0234 – Antispila nysaefoliella, tupelo leafminer moth
0235 – Antispila eugeniella
0236 – Antispila isabella
0237 – Antispila viticordifoliella
no number yet – Antispila oinophylla
0238 – Stephensia major
0239 – Antispila aurirubra
0240 – Antispila ampelopsifoliella
0241 – Antispila voraginella
0242 – Antispila argentifera
0243 – Antispila hydrangaeella
0244 – Coptodisca diospyriella
0245 – Coptodisca condaliae
0246 – Coptodisca ella
0247 – Coptodisca lucifluella
0248 – Coptodisca juglandiella
0249 – Coptodisca magnella
0250 – Coptodisca matheri
0251 – Coptodisca negligens
0252 – Coptodisca ostryaefoliella
0253 – Coptodisca saliciella
0254 – Coptodisca splendoriferella
0255 – Coptodisca arbutiella
0256 – Coptodisca kalmiella
0257 – Coptodisca ribesella
0258 – Coptodisca cercocarpella
0259 – Coptodisca quercicolella
0260 – Coptodisca powellella

Tineidae and Acrolophidae
0261 – Nemapogon acapnopennella
0262 – Nemapogon angulifasciella
0263 – Nemapogon auropulvella
0263.5 – Nemapogon clematella
0264 – Nemapogon defectella
0265 – Nemapogon geniculatella
0266 – Nemapogon granella, European grain moth
0267 – Nemapogon interstitiella
0268 – Nemapogon molybdanella
0269 – Nemapogon multistriatella
0270 – Nemapogon ophrionella
0271 – Nemapogon oregonella
0272 – Nemapogon rileyi
0273 – Nemapogon roburella
0274 – Nemapogon tylodes
0275 – Nemapogon variatella
0276 – Doleromorpha porphyria
0277 – Eudarcia eunitariaeella
0278 – Eudarcia simulatricella
0279 – Diachorisia velatella
0280 – Bathroxena heteropalpella
0281 – Augolychna septemstrigella
0282 – Leucomele miriamella
0283 – Oenoe hybromella
0284 – Homosetia argentinotella
0285 – Homosetia argentistrigella
0286 – Homosetia auricristatella
0287 – Homosetia bifasciella
0288 – Homosetia chrysoadspersella
0289 – Homosetia costisignella
0290 – Homosetia cristatella
0291 – Homosetia fasciella
0292 – Homosetia fuscocristatella
0293 – Homosetia marginimaculella
0294 – Homosetia miscecristatella
0295 – Homosetia tricingulatella
0296 – Stenoptinea auriferella
0297 – Stenoptinea ornatella
0298 – Isocorypha chrysocomella
0299 – Isocorypha mediostriatella, old gold isocorypha moth
0300 – Hybroma servulella, yellow wave moth
0301 – Homostinea curviliniella
0302 – Pompostolella charipepla
0303 – Erechthias zebrina
0304 – Erechthias minuscula, Caribbean scavenger moth
0305 – Mea bipunctella, two-spotted mea moth
0306 – Mea skinnerella
0307 – Dryadaula visaliella
0307.1 – Dryadaula terpsichorella
0308 – Scardiella approximatella
0309 – Amorophaga cryptophori
0310 – Montescardia fuscofasciella
0311 – Scardia anatomella
0312 – Daviscardia coloradella
0313 – Morophagoides berkeleyella
0314 – Morophagoides burkerella
0315 – Diataga leptosceles
0316 – Xylesthia albicans
0317 – Xylesthia pruniramiella, Clemens' bark moth
0318 – Phryganeopsis brunnea
0319 – Kearfottia albifasciella
0320 – Hypoplesia busckiella
0321 – Hypoplesia dietziella
0322 – Dyotopasta yumaella
0323 – Tenaga pomiliella
0324 – Cephitinea obscurostrigella
0325 – Haplotinea insectella, fungus grain moth
0326 – Apreta paradoxella
0327 – Amydria apachella
0328 – Amydria arizonella
0329 – Amydria brevipennella
0330 – Amydria clemensella
0331 – Amydria confusella
0332 – Amydria curvistrigella
0333 – Amydria dyarella
0334 – Amydria effrentella
0335 – Amydria margoriella
0336 – Amydria obliquella
0337 – Amydria onagella
0338 – Acrolophus acanthogonus
0339 – Acrolophus acornus
0340 – Acrolophus arcanella, grass tubeworm moth
0341 – Acrolophus arizonellus
0342 – Acrolophus baldufi
0343 – Acrolophus bicornutus
0344 – Acrolophus chiricahuae
0345 – Acrolophus cockerelli
0346 – Acrolophus crescentella
0347 – Acrolophus cressoni, Cresson's grass tubeworm moth
0348 – Acrolophus davisellus
0349 – Acrolophus dorsimaculus
0350 – Acrolophus exaphristus
0351 – Acrolophus fervidus
0352 – Acrolophus filicornus
0353 – Acrolophus forbesi
0354 – Acrolophus furcatus
0355 – Acrolophus griseus
0355.1 – Acrolophus heppneri
0356 – Acrolophus juxtatus
0357 – Acrolophus kearfotti
0358 – Acrolophus klotsi
0359 – Acrolophus laticapitanus
0360 – Acrolophus leucodocis
0361 – Acrolophus luriei
0362 – Acrolophus macrogaster
0363 – Acrolophus macrophallus
0364 – Acrolophus maculifer
0365 – Acrolophus minor
0366 – Acrolophus mortipennella
0367 – Acrolophus morus
0367.1 – Acrolophus mycetophagus, frilly grass tubeworm moth
0368 – Acrolophus panamae, Panama grass tubeworm moth
0369 – Acrolophus parvipalpus
0370 – Acrolophus persimplex
0370.1 – Acrolophus pholeter
0371 – Acrolophus piger, piger grass tubeworm moth
0372 – Acrolophus plumifrontella, eastern grass tubeworm moth
0373 – Acrolophus popeanella, Clemens' grass tubeworm moth
0374 – Acrolophus propinquus, Walsingham's grass tubeworm moth
0375 – Acrolophus pseudohirsutus
0376 – Acrolophus punctellus
0377 – Acrolophus pyramellus
0378 – Acrolophus quadrellus
0379 – Acrolophus seculatus
0380 – Acrolophus serratus
0381 – Acrolophus simulatus
0382 – Acrolophus sinclairi
0382.1 – Acrolophus spilotus
0383 – Acrolophus texanella, Texas grass tubeworm moth
0384 – Acrolophus vanduzeei
0385 – Acrolophus variabilis
0386 – Acrolophus vauriei
0387 – Dorata atomophora
0388 – Dorata inornatella
0389 – Dorata lineata
0390 – Phereoeca uterella, household casebearer moth
0390.1 – Phereoeca praecox
0391 – Tryptodema sepulchrella
0392 – Tinea apicimaculella
0393 – Tinea behrensella
0394 – Tinea carnariella
0395 – Tinea columbariella
0396 – Tinea croceoverticella
0397 – Tinea dubiella
0398 – Tinea grumella
0399 – Tinea irrepta
0400 – Tinea mandarinella, Mandarin tinea moth
0401 – Tinea misceella
0402 – Tinea niveocapitella
0403 – Tinea occidentella, western clothes moth
0404 – Tinea pallescentella
0405 – Tinea pellionella, casemaking clothes moth
0406 – Tinea straminella, large pale clothes moth
0407 – Tinea thoracestrigella
0408 – Tinea translucens
0409 – Tinea unomaculella
0410 – Tinea xanthostictella
0411 – Niditinea fuscella, European house moth
0412 – Niditinea orleansella
0413 – Trichophaga tapetzella, carpet moth
0414 – Ceratophaga vicinella, gopher tortoise moth
0415 – Monopis crocicapitella, bird nest moth
0415.1 – Monopis laevigella
0415.2 – Monopis weaverella
0416 – Monopis dorsistrigella, skunkback monopis moth
0417 – Monopis marginistrigella
0418 – Monopis monachella, white-headed monopis moth
0418.1 – Monopis pavlovski, Pavlovski's monopis moth
0419 – Monopis mycetophilella
0420 – Monopis rusticella
0421 – Monopis spilotella
0422 – Eccritothrix trimaculella
0423 – Praeacedes atomosella, African scavenger moth
0425 – Elatobia carbonella
0426 – Tineola bisselliella, webbing clothes moth
0426.1 – Xystrologa antipathetica
0427 – Tiquadra inscitella
0428 – Setomorpha rutella, tropical tobacco moth
0429 – Lindera tessellatella
0430 – Phaeoses sabinella
0431 – Opogona arizonensis
0432 – Opogona floridensis
0432.1 – Opogona sacchari, banana moth
0433 – Opogona omoscopa
0433.1 – Opogona purpuriella
0434 – Oinophila v-flava
0434.1 – Pelecystola nearctica

Psychidae
0435 – Taleporia walshella
0436 – Dahlica triquetrella
0436.1 – Dahlica lichenella
0437 – Psyche casta, common bagworm moth
0438 – Apterona helix, snailcase bagworm moth
0438.1 – Apterona helicoidella
0439 – Prochalia pygmaea
0440 – Zamopsyche commentella
0441 – Cryptothelea nigrita, nigrita bagworm moth
0442 – Cryptothelea gloverii
0443 – Astala confederata
0444 – Astala polingi
0445 – Astala edwardsi
0446 – Hyaloscotes coniferella
0447 – Hyaloscotes fragmentella
0448 – Hyaloscotes fumosa
0449 – Hyaloscotes pithopoera
0450 – Basicladus tracyi
0451 – Basicladus celibatus
0451.1 – Coloneura fragilis
0452 – Oiketicus toumeyi
0453 – Oiketicus townsendi
0454 – Oiketicus abbotii, Abbot's bagworm moth
0455 – Thyridopteryx meadii
0456 – Thyridopteryx alcora
0457 – Thyridopteryx ephemeraeformis, evergreen bagworm moth
0458 – Thyridopteryx rileyi
0459 – Thyridopteryx davidsoni
0460 – Ochsenheimeria vacculella, cereal stem moth
0461 – Euprora argentiliniella

Lyonetiidae
0462 – Philonome clemensella
0463 – Philonome luteella
0464 – Philonome albella
no number – Philonome nigrescens
no number – Philonome wielgusi
0465 – Bedellia minor, Florida morning-glory leafminer moth
0466 – Bedellia somnulentella, morning-glory leafminer moth
0467 – Eulyonetia inornatella
0468 – Lyonetia alniella
0469 – Lyonetia candida
0470 – Lyonetia latistrigella
0471 – Lyonetia saliciella
0472 – Lyonetia prunifoliella
0473 – Acanthocnemes fuscoscapulella
0474 – Proleucoptera smilaciella
0475 – Paraleucoptera albella, cottonwood leafminer moth
0475.1 – Paraleucoptera heinrichi
0476 – Corythophora aurea
0477 – Leucoptera erythrinella
0478 – Leucoptera guettardella
0479 – Leucoptera laburnella, laburnum leaf miner moth
0480 – Leucoptera pachystimella
0481 – Leucoptera robinella
0482 – Leucoptera spartifoliella
0483 – Exegetia crocea

Bucculatricidae
0484 – Bucculatrix fusicola
0485 – Bucculatrix solidaginiella
0486 – Bucculatrix montana
0487 – Bucculatrix magnella
0488 – Bucculatrix needhami
0489 – Bucculatrix longula
0490 – Bucculatrix simulans
0491 – Bucculatrix niveella
0492 – Bucculatrix parvinotata
0493 – Bucculatrix ochritincta
0494 – Bucculatrix viguierae
0495 – Bucculatrix micropunctata
0496 – Bucculatrix inusitata
0497 – Bucculatrix seneciensis
0498 – Bucculatrix bicristata
0499 – Bucculatrix cuneigera
0500 – Bucculatrix albaciliella
0501 – Bucculatrix ochristrigella
0502 – Bucculatrix eurotiella
0503 – Bucculatrix tenebricosa
0504 – Bucculatrix ericameriae
0505 – Bucculatrix variabilis
0505.1 – Bucculatrix dominatrix
0506 – Bucculatrix separabilis
0507 – Bucculatrix brunnescens
0508 – Bucculatrix evanescens
0509 – Bucculatrix benenotata
0510 – Bucculatrix floccosa
0511 – Bucculatrix flourensiae
0512 – Bucculatrix franseriae
0513 – Bucculatrix staintonella
0514 – Bucculatrix immaculatella
0515 – Bucculatrix agnella
0516 – Bucculatrix kimballi
0517 – Bucculatrix ivella
0518 – Bucculatrix ambrosiaefoliella
0519 – Bucculatrix pallidula
0520 – Bucculatrix taeniola
0521 – Bucculatrix carolinae
0522 – Bucculatrix angustata
0523 – Bucculatrix adelpha
0524 – Bucculatrix plucheae
0525 – Bucculatrix eupatoriella
0525.1 – Bucculatrix kendalli
0526 – Bucculatrix polymniae
0527 – Bucculatrix speciosa
0528 – Bucculatrix subnitens
0529 – Bucculatrix sexnotata
0530 – Bucculatrix divisa
0531 – Bucculatrix illecebrosa
0532 – Bucculatrix insolita
0533 – Bucculatrix transversata
0534 – Bucculatrix koebelella
0535 – Bucculatrix salutatoria
0536 – Bucculatrix leptalea
0537 – Bucculatrix arnicella
0538 – Bucculatrix tridenticola
0539 – Bucculatrix spectabilis
0540 – Bucculatrix seorsa
0541 – Bucculatrix angustisquamella
0542 – Bucculatrix columbiana
0543 – Bucculatrix sororcula
0544 – Bucculatrix nigripunctella
0545 – Bucculatrix atrosignata
0546 – Bucculatrix enceliae
0547 – Bucculatrix latella
0547.1 – Bucculatrix tetradymiae
0548 – Bucculatrix sporobolella
0549 – Bucculatrix packardella
0550 – Bucculatrix albertiella, oak-ribbed skeletonizer moth
0551 – Bucculatrix coniforma
0552 – Bucculatrix platyphylla
0553 – Bucculatrix ochrisuffusa
0554 – Bucculatrix trifasciella
0555 – Bucculatrix quinquenotella
0556 – Bucculatrix domicola
0557 – Bucculatrix zophopasta
0558 – Bucculatrix litigiosella
0559 – Bucculatrix coronatella
0560 – Bucculatrix canadensisella, birch skeletonizer moth
0561 – Bucculatrix improvisa
0562 – Bucculatrix polytita
0563 – Bucculatrix luteella
0564 – Bucculatrix recognita
0565 – Bucculatrix paroptila
0566 – Bucculatrix fugitans
0567 – Bucculatrix callistricha
0568 – Bucculatrix eugrapha
0569 – Bucculatrix cerina
0570 – Bucculatrix copeuta
0571 – Bucculatrix locuples
0572 – Bucculatrix ainsliella, oak skeletonizer moth
0573 – Bucculatrix eclecta
0574 – Bucculatrix anaticula
0575 – Bucculatrix disjuncta
0576 – Bucculatrix ceanothiella
0577 – Bucculatrix pomifoliella
0578 – Bucculatrix ilecella
0579 – Bucculatrix quadrigemina
0580 – Bucculatrix gossypiella
0581 – Bucculatrix sphaeralceae
0582 – Bucculatrix thurberiella
0582.1 – Bucculatrix frigida

Gracillariidae
0583 – Caloptilia aceriella
0584 – Caloptilia acerifoliella
0585 – Caloptilia agrifoliella
0586 – Caloptilia alnicolella
0587 – Caloptilia alnivorella, alder leafminer moth
0588 – Caloptilia amphidelta
0589 – Caloptilia anthobaphes
0590 – Caloptilia asplenifoliatella
0591 – Caloptilia atomosella
0592 – Caloptilia azaleella, azalea leafminer moth
0593 – Caloptilia behrensella
0594 – Caloptilia belfragella
0594.1 – Caloptilia betulivora
0595 – Caloptilia bimaculatella
0596 – Caloptilia blandella
0597 – Caloptilia burgessiella
0598 – Caloptilia burserella
0599 – Caloptilia canadensisella
0600 – Caloptilia cornusella
0601 – Caloptilia coroniella
0602 – Caloptilia diversilobiella
0603 – Caloptilia ferruginella
0604 – Caloptilia flavella
0605 – Caloptilia flavimaculella
0606 – Caloptilia fraxinella, ash leaf cone roller moth
0607 – Caloptilia glutinella
0608 – Caloptilia hypericella
0609 – Caloptilia invariabilis, cherry leaf-cone caterpillar moth
0610 – Caloptilia juglandiella
0611 – Caloptilia macranthes
0612 – Caloptilia melanocarpae
0613 – Caloptilia minimella
0614 – Caloptilia murtfeldtella
0615 – Caloptilia negundella, boxelder leafroller moth
0616 – Caloptilia nondeterminata
0617 – Caloptilia obscuripennella
0618 – Caloptilia ostryaeella
0619 – Caloptilia ovatiella
0620 – Caloptilia packardella
0621 – Caloptilia palustriella
0622 – Caloptilia paradoxa
0623 – Caloptilia perseae
0624 – Caloptilia populiella
0625 – Caloptilia porphyretica
0626 – Caloptilia pulchella
0627 – Povolnya quercinigrella
0628 – Caloptilia reticulata
0629 – Caloptilia rhodorella
0630 – Caloptilia rhoifoliella, sumac leafblotch miner moth
0631 – Caloptilia ribesella
0632 – Caloptilia sanguinella
0633 – Caloptilia sassafrasella, sassafras caloptilia moth
0634 – Caloptilia sauzalitoeella
0635 – Caloptilia scutellariella
0636 – Caloptilia sebastianiella
0637 – Caloptilia serotinella
0638 – Caloptilia speciosella
0639 – Caloptilia stigmatella
0640 – Caloptilia strictella
0641 – Caloptilia superbifrontella
0642 – Caloptilia umbratella
0643 – Caloptilia vacciniella
0644 – Caloptilia violacella
0645 – Caloptilia syringella, lilac leafminer moth
0646 – Neurostrota gunniella
0647 – Micrurapteryx salicifoliella, willow leafblotch miner moth
0648 – Parectopa albicostella
0649 – Parectopa basquella
0650 – Parectopa bumeliella
0651 – Parectopa geraniella
0652 – Parectopa interpositella
0653 – Parectopa lespedezaefoliella
0654 – Parectopa occulta
0655 – Parectopa pennsylvaniella
0656 – Parectopa plantaginisella
0657 – Parectopa robiniella, locust digitate leafminer moth
0658 – Parectopa thermopsella
0659 – Neurolipa randiella
0660 – Apophthisis congregata
0661 – Apophthisis pullata
0662 – Neurobathra bohartiella
0663 – Neurobathra strigifinitella
0663.1 – Neurobathra curcassi, jatropha leafminer moth
0664 – Callisto denticulella
0665 – Parornix alta
0666 – Parornix arbitrella
0667 – Parornix arbutifoliella
0668 – Parornix boreasella
0669 – Parornix conspicuella
0670 – Parornix crataegifoliella
0671 – Parornix dubitella
0672 – Parornix festinella
0673 – Parornix geminatella, unspotted tentiform leafminer moth
0674 – Parornix innotata
0675 – Parornix inusitatumella
0676 – Parornix kalmiella
0677 – Parornix melanotella
0678 – Parornix obliterella
0679 – Parornix peregrinaella
0680 – Parornix preciosella
0681 – Parornix quadripunctella
0681.1 – Parornix solitariella
0682 – Parornix spiraeifoliella
0683 – Parornix strobivorella
0684 – Parornix texanella
0685 – Parornix trepidella
0686 – Parornix vicinella
0687 – Chilocampyla dyariella
0688 – Acrocercops affinis
0689 – Acrocercops albinatella
0690 – Acrocercops arbutella
0691 – Acrocercops insulariella
0692 – Acrocercops astericola
0693 – Acrocercops pnosmodiella
0694 – Acrocercops quinquistrigella
0695 – Acrocercops rhombiderella
0696 – Eucosmophora sideroxylonella
0696.1 – Eucosmophora manilkarae
0696.2 – Eucosmophora pithecollobiae
0697 – Acrocercops strigosus
0698 – Leucospilapteryx venustella
0699 – Metriochroa psychotriella
0700 – Leucanthiza amphicarpeaefoliella
0701 – Leucanthiza dircella
0702 – Marmara apocynella
0703 – Marmara arbutiella
0704 – Marmara auratella
0705 – Marmara basidendroca
0706 – Marmara corticola
0707 – Marmara elotella, apple barkminer moth
0708 – Marmara fasciella, white pine barkminer moth
0709 – Marmara fraxinicola
0710 – Marmara fulgidella
0711 – Marmara guilandinella
0712 – Marmara leptodesma
0713 – Marmara opuntiella
0714 – Marmara oregonensis
0715 – Marmara pomonella, apple fruitminer moth
0716 – Marmara salictella
0717 – Marmara serotinella
0718 – Marmara smilacisella
0718.1 – Marmara gulosa, citrus peelminer moth
no number yet – Marmara habecki
0719 – Protolithocolletis lathyri
0720 – Cremastobombycia ambrosiella
0721 – Cremastobombycia grindeliella
0722 – Cremastobombycia ignota
0723 – Cremastobombycia solidaginis
0724 – Cremastobombycia verbesinella
0725 – Phyllonorycter aberrans
0726 – Phyllonorycter aeriferella
0726.1 – Phyllonorycter alaskana
0727 – Phyllonorycter albanotella
0728 – Phyllonorycter alni
0729 – Phyllonorycter alnicolella
0730 – Phyllonorycter antiochella
0731 – Phyllonorycter apicinigrella
0732 – Phyllonorycter arbutusella
0733 – Phyllonorycter argentifimbriella
0734 – Phyllonorycter argentinotella
0735 – Phyllonorycter arizonella
0736 – Phyllonorycter apparella, aspen leaf blotch miner moth
0737 – Phyllonorycter auronitens
0738 – Phyllonorycter basistrigella
0739 – Phyllonorycter bataviella
0740 – Phyllonorycter blancardella, spotted tentiform leafminer moth
0741 – Phyllonorycter caryaealbella, pecan blotchminer moth
0742 – Phyllonorycter celtifoliella
0743 – Phyllonorycter celtisella
0744 – Phyllonorycter clemensella
0745 – Phyllonorycter comptoniella
0746 – Phyllonorycter crataegella, apple blotch leafminer moth
0747 – Phyllonorycter cretaceella
0748 – Phyllonorycter deceptusella
0748.1 – Phyllonorycter deserticola
0749 – Phyllonorycter diaphanella
0750 – Phyllonorycter diversella
0750.1 – Phyllonorycter emberizaepenella
0750.2 – Phyllonorycter elmaella, western tentiform leafminer moth
0750.3 – Phyllonorycter erugatus
0751 – Phyllonorycter felinelle
0752 – Phyllonorycter fitchella
0753 – Phyllonorycter fragilella
0754 – Phyllonorycter gemmea
0755 – Phyllonorycter hagenii
0756 – Phyllonorycter holodisci
0757 – Phyllonorycter incanella
0758 – Phyllonorycter insignis
0759 – Phyllonorycter intermixtus
0760 – Phyllonorycter inusitatella
0761 – Phyllonorycter kearfottella
0761.1 – Phyllonorycter latus
0763 – Phyllonorycter ledella
0764 – Phyllonorycter lucetiella, basswood miner moth
0765 – Phyllonorycter lucidicostella, lesser maple leaf blotch miner moth
0766 – Phyllonorycter lysimachiaeella
0767 – Phyllonorycter malimalifoliella
0768 – Phyllonorycter manzanita
0769 – Phyllonorycter mariaeella
0770 – Phyllonorycter martiella
0771 – Phyllonorycter memorabilis
0771.1 – Phyllonorycter mespilella
0771.2 – Phyllonorycter mildredae
0772 – Phyllonorycter minutella
0773 – Phyllonorycter morrisella
0774 – Phyllonorycter nipigon, balsam poplar leaf blotch miner moth
0775 – Phyllonorycter obscuricostella
0776 – Phyllonorycter obsoleta
0777 – Phyllonorycter occitanica
0778 – Phyllonorycter olivaeformis
0780 – Phyllonorycter oregonensis
0781 – Phyllonorycter ostryaefoliella
0782 – Phyllonorycter pernivalis
0783 – Phyllonorycter populiella, poplar leafminer moth
0784 – Phyllonorycter propinquinella, cherry blotch miner moth
0785 – Phyllonorycter quercialbella
0786 – Phyllonorycter restrictella
0787 – Phyllonorycter rhododendrella
0788 – Phyllonorycter ribefoliae
0789 – Phyllonorycter rileyella
0790 – Phyllonorycter robiniella
0791 – Phyllonorycter salicifoliella, willow leaf blotch miner moth
0792 – Phyllonorycter salicivorella
0793 – Phyllonorycter sandraella
0794 – Phyllonorycter scudderella
0795 – Phyllonorycter sexnotella
0796 – Phyllonorycter symphoricarpaeella
0797 – Phyllonorycter tiliacella, basswood round-blotch miner moth
0799 – Phyllonorycter trinotella
0800 – Phyllonorycter tritaenianella
0801 – Phyllonorycter uhlerella
0802 – Phyllonorycter viburnella
0803 – Cameraria aceriella, maple leaf blotch miner moth
0804 – Cameraria aesculisella
0805 – Cameraria affinis
0806 – Cameraria agrifoliella
0806.1 – Cameraria anomala
0807 – Cameraria arcuella
0808 – Cameraria australisella
0809 – Cameraria bethunella
0810 – Cameraria betulivora, birch-leaf blotchminer moth
0811 – Cameraria caryaefoliella, pecan leafminer moth
0812 – Cameraria castaneaeella
0813 – Cameraria cervina
0814 – Cameraria chambersella
0815 – Cameraria cincinnatiella, gregarious oak leafminer moth
0816 – Cameraria conglomeratella
0817 – Cameraria corylisella
0817.1 – Cameraria diabloensis
0818 – Cameraria eppelsheimii
0819 – Cameraria fasciella
0820 – Cameraria fletcherella
0821 – Cameraria gaultheriella
0822 – Cameraria guttifinitella
0823 – Cameraria hamadryadella, solitary oak leafminer moth
0824 – Cameraria hamameliella
0824.1 – Cameraria jacintoensis
0825 – Cameraria lentella
0826 – Cameraria leucothorax
0826.1 – Cameraria lobatiella
0827 – Cameraria macrocarpae
0828 – Cameraria macrocarpella
0828.1 – Cameraria marinensis
0829 – Cameraria mediodorsella
0829.1 – Cameraria mendocinensis
0830 – Cameraria nemoris
0831 – Cameraria obstrictella
0832 – Cameraria ostryarella
0832.1 – Cameraria pentekes
0833 – Cameraria picturatella
0834 – Cameraria platanoidiella
0835 – Cameraria quercivorella
0836 – Cameraria saccharella
0836.1 – Cameraria sadlerianella
0836.2 – Cameraria sempervirensella
0836.3 – Cameraria serpentinensis
0836.4 – Cameraria shenaniganensis
0837 – Cameraria superimposita
0837.1 – Cameraria tildeni
0837.2 – Cameraria temblorensis
0838 – Cameraria tubiferella
0839 – Cameraria ulmella
0840 – Cameraria umbellulariae
0840.1 – Cameraria walsinghami
0841 – Cameraria wislizeniella
0842 – Chrysaster ostensackenella
0843 – Porphyrosela desmodiella
0844 – Phyllocnistis ampelopsiella
0845 – Phyllocnistis finitima
0846 – Phyllocnistis insignis
0847 – Phyllocnistis intermediella
0848 – Phyllocnistis liquidambarisella
0849 – Phyllocnistis liriodendronella
0850 – Phyllocnistis magnatella
0851 – Phyllocnistis magnoliella, magnolia serpentine leafminer moth
0851.1 – Phyllocnistis meliacella, mahogany leafminer moth
0852 – Phyllocnistis populiella, aspen serpentine leafminer moth
0853 – Phyllocnistis vitegenella
0854 – Phyllocnistis vitifoliella
0854.1 – Phyllocnistis citrella, citrus leafminer moth
No number yet Phyllocnistis hyperpersea
No number yet Phyllocnistis longipalpa
No number yet Phyllocnistis subpersea

See also
List of butterflies of North America
List of Lepidoptera of Hawaii
List of moths of Canada
List of butterflies of Canada

External links
Checklists of North American Moths

Moths of North America
North America